The Croatia national rugby sevens team is a minor national sevens side. They compete annually in the Rugby Europe sevens championship.

Rugby Europe Sevens 
Croatia won the 2016 Rugby Europe Sevens Conferences and were promoted to the Rugby Europe Sevens Trophy for 2017.

References

Rugby union in Croatia
National rugby sevens teams